Teeratep Winothai (born 16 February 1985), simply known as Leesaw is a Thai retired footballer playing as a forward. He previously spent his youth career with England's Crystal Palace and Everton.

He got a bachelor's degree from the Faculty of Education from Chulalongkorn University.

Club career

Youth career

He studied at Brentwood School, a private school in Essex, UK. During this time he represented the Thai national team at schoolboy level as well as being on the books of London-based club Crystal Palace. His performances for his school helped them reach the final of the 2001 Independent Schools FA Cup, scoring 8 goals in 4 games along the way. He eventually moved to Everton for one year before returning to Thailand.

Senior career

The young forward joined Thai Premier League side BEC Tero Sasana in 2006 at age of 21 and played for the club until 2008 made totally 65 appearances scored 22 goals and won the 2008 Striker of the Year award.

In 2009, a Belgian side Lierse S.K. signed the Thai star with an undisclosed deal. However, Leesaw spent most of his time with the new club in reserve team and made only 8 appearances with 1 goal. Later in the first season with the Belgian club, he was moved back to Thailand and played for Thai Premier League champions Muangthong United on a loan deal.

Teeratep made 23 appearances and scored 4 goals before spending the rest of his loan spell with his former club, BEC Tero Sasana, in the same season and made 8 appearances with 3 goals. Leesaw eventually rejoined BEC Tero Sasana, leading to 15 appearances and 3 goals from the injury suffer in 2010–2011 season. In early 2012, Teeratep was on the move again to 2010–2011 Thai Premier League 4th place club, Bangkok Glass.

In 2013 Teeratep played against Manchester United in a TPL All-Stars team. He scored the winning goal, beating United in David Moyes' first match in charge, during their pre-season tour.

Police United

Teeratep joined Police United in 2014, but club relegation from Thai Premier League
In 2015 meant Teeratep would play for Police United in Thai Division 1 League. Teerathep's first goal of the season was against PTT Rayong at PTT Stadium in a match Police United won 2–1. On 17 October 2015 Teeratep scored his first hattrick of the season against PTT Rayong at Boonyachinda Stadium the team went on to win 6–0. At the end of the season Police United were promoted to the Thai Premier League.

Bangkok United
On 24 January 2016, Winothai joined Bangkok United.

Chonburi FC
On 26 June 2019, Winothai joined Chonburi on loan from Bangkok United. He scored his first goal for Chonburi in match against PTT Rayong.

Retirement
Teeratep officially announced his retirement from professional football on 28 November 2022. After he led his team, Police Tero to win against Nakhon Ratchasima by scoring the winning goal in the penalty spot for the team to collect 3 points as the final match by ending his football career at 96 goals in the Thai League.

International career

Teeratep has been included in the national team setup since a very young age and is a very versatile player, playing either on the wing or as a striker. Teeratep first came to the fore in the King's Cup in 2005 and has been a squad regular since, only being rested when called up to represent the nation in Olympic qualifying matches or in SEA Games. He represented Thailand in the 1999 FIFA U-17 World Championship in New Zealand. In the final of the 2005 SEA Games match against Vietnam, he scored a hat-trick and helped Thailand claim the gold medal for the 7th consecutive time.

Teeratep has been called up to new coach Peter Reid's first squad selection, to play in the T&T Cup 2008 hosted by Vietnam. Teeratep was a member of the victorious T&T Cup 2008 winning squad.

On 6 March 2014, he played for Thailand against Lebanon in the 2015 AFC Asian Cup qualification, and scored a goal.

Football Association of Thailand held a retirement farewell match on 14 December 2022, in honor of Teerathep, who has been a member of the Thai national team since he was 14 years old and has played for them at every level. His performance in the first half, which lasted 30 minutes, resulted in a 1–0 loss for the Thai national football team versus the Chinese Taipei squad.

Style of play

Teeratep is known for his pace and work rate. Teeratep originally played as a striker, but could also play as a left winger or a right winger.

Statistics

International goals
Scores and results list Thailand's goal tally first.

Honours

Club
Muangthong United
 Thai Premier League (1): 2009

Police United
 Thai Division 1 League (1): 2015

International
Thailand U-20
 AFF U-19 Youth Championship (1): 2002

Thailand U-23
 Sea Games  Gold medal (4): 2001, 2003, 2005, 2007

Thailand
 T&T Cup (1): 2008
 King's Cup (1): 2017

Individual
 Thai Premier League Striker of the Year (1): 2008
 Thai Premier League Player of the Month (1): September 2013

References

External links
 
 

1985 births
Living people
Teeratep Winothai
Teeratep Winothai
Association football forwards
Teeratep Winothai
Lierse S.K. players
Teeratep Winothai
Teeratep Winothai
Teeratep Winothai
Teeratep Winothai
Teeratep Winothai
Challenger Pro League players
Teeratep Winothai
Teeratep Winothai
Teeratep Winothai
Expatriate footballers in Belgium
Teeratep Winothai
Teeratep Winothai
Footballers at the 2006 Asian Games
2007 AFC Asian Cup players
Teeratep Winothai
Southeast Asian Games medalists in football
Competitors at the 2001 Southeast Asian Games
Competitors at the 2003 Southeast Asian Games
Competitors at the 2005 Southeast Asian Games
Competitors at the 2007 Southeast Asian Games
Teeratep Winothai
Teeratep Winothai